The Al-Falah Mosque is a mosque in Belize City, Belize.

History
The mosque was officially opened on 16 May 2008 in a ceremony attended by Chief Justice Abdulai Conteh. It was constructed with a cost around US$500,000.

Architecture
The mosque is made of bricks. The site of the building covers an area of 1,115 m2 and can accommodate up to 300 worshipers. It also includes meeting rooms, library, kitchen, accommodation, boardroom and classroom.

See also
 Islam in Belize

References

2008 establishments in Belize
Buildings and structures in Belize City
Islam in Belize
Mosques completed in 2008
Mosques in Central America